Serena libre is an alcoholic cocktail made of pisco and papaya juice that was created during the 1990s in the bars of La Serena, Chile. It mixes the juice of a papaya and pisco, typical products of the Coquimbo Region.

Mix over ice:
 3 measures of papaya juice 
 1 measure of Pisco liquor
 Powdered sugar to taste.

References

Pisco
Chilean alcoholic drinks
Cocktails with brandy
Coquimbo Region